The 15th Pan American Games were held in Rio de Janeiro, Brazil from 13 July 2007 to 29 July 2007.

Medals

Gold

Women's 20 km Road Walk: Cristina López

Silver

Men's – 56 kg: Marvin López

Women's Freestyle 48 kg: Ingrid Medrano

Women's 10 metre air pistol: Luisa Maida

Bronze

Men's Judo Half-middleweight (81 kg): Franklin Cisneros

Men's Kumite (– 65 kg): Aron Pérez
Men's Kumite (– 75 kg): William Serrano

Women's Single Sculls: Camila Vargas

Women's – 75 kg: Eva María Dimas

Women's 25 metre air pistol: Luisa Maida

Results by event

Triathlon

Men's Competition
Carlos Hernández
 1:57:44.19 — 23rd place

See also
El Salvador at the 2008 Summer Olympics

External links
Rio 2007 Official website

Nations at the 2007 Pan American Games
P
2007